Philip Bester and Peter Polansky were the defending champions but chose not to defend their title.

Austin Krajicek and Jackson Withrow won the title after defeating Kevin King and Dean O'Brien 6–7(4–7), 7–6(7–5), [11–9] in the final.

Seeds

Draw

References
 Main Draw

Morelos Open - Doubles
Morelos Open